Kristoffer Khazeni (born 25 June 1995) is a Swedish footballer who plays as a midfielder for IFK Norrköping in Allsvenskan.

Club career
A prolific goalscorer from the Swedish lower leagues, Khazeni made his Allsvenskan debut for IFK Norrköping on 17 May 2021 against Varbergs BoIS during the 2021 season. He scored his first Allsvenskan goal on 22 September 2021 against IK Sirius.

References 

1995 births
Living people
Swedish footballers
Swedish people of Iranian descent
Sportspeople of Iranian descent
Association football midfielders
IF Sylvia players
IFK Norrköping players
Ettan Fotboll players
Allsvenskan players
Footballers from Stockholm